Valley Springs is a city in Minnehaha County, South Dakota, United States. The population was 885 at the 2020 census.

History
Valley Springs was founded on November 13, 1872, and incorporated on February 22, 1879. The city was named from nearby springs in the valley of Beaver Creek.

Geography
Valley Springs lies near the South Dakota—Minnesota state line.

Demographics

2010 census
As of the census of 2010, there were 759 people, 306 households, and 202 families residing in the city. The racial makeup of the city was 95.9% White, 0.5% African American, 0.7% Native American, 0.1% Asian, 0.8% from other races, and 2.0% from two or more races. Hispanic or Latino of any race were 1.2% of the population.

There were 306 households, of which 36.9% had children under the age of 18 living with them, 50.7% were married couples living together, 9.5% had a female householder with no husband present, 5.9% had a male householder with no wife present, and 34.0% were non-families. 28.4% of all households were made up of individuals, and 8.5% had someone living alone who was 65 years of age or older. The average household size was 2.48 and the average family size was 3.00.

The median age in the city was 36.4 years. 28.2% of residents were under the age of 18; 6% were between the ages of 18 and 24; 29.7% were from 25 to 44; 28% were from 45 to 64; and 8% were 65 years of age or older. The gender makeup of the city was 52.6% male and 47.4% female.

2000 census
As of the census of 2000, there were 792 people, 292 households, and 212 families residing in the city. The population density was 975.8 people per square mile (377.5/km2). There were 299 housing units at an average density of 368.4 per square mile (142.5/km2). The racial makeup of the city was 98.48% White, 0.25% Native American, 0.38% Asian, 0.63% from other races, and 0.25% from two or more races. Hispanic or Latino of any race were 1.01% of the population.

There were 292 households, out of which 38.4% had children under the age of 18 living with them, 58.9% were married couples living together, 9.6% had a female householder with no husband present, and 27.1% were non-families. 21.6% of all households were made up of individuals, and 9.9% had someone living alone who was 65 years of age or older. The average household size was 2.71 and the average family size was 3.17.

In the city, the population was spread out, with 29.8% under the age of 18, 9.3% from 18 to 24, 32.4% from 25 to 44, 19.7% from 45 to 64, and 8.7% who were 65 years of age or older. The median age was 32 years. For every 100 females, there were 95.1 males. For every 100 females age 18 and over, there were 101.4 males.

The median income for a household in the city was $45,089, and the median income for a family was $49,167. Males had a median income of $28,839 versus $21,000 for females. The per capita income for the city was $16,507. About 4.3% of families and 7.0% of the population were below the poverty line, including 9.2% of those under age 18 and 4.2% of those age 65 or over.

Education
Valley Springs Public Schools are part of the Brandon Valley School District. The city is home to Valley Springs Elementary School, one of the district's four elementary schools.

References

External links
City of Valley Springs, South Dakota
Brandon Valley School District

Cities in Minnehaha County, South Dakota
Cities in South Dakota
Sioux Falls, South Dakota metropolitan area